Gullar or Kullar may refer to:
Qullar, Agdam, a village in Azerbaijan
Qullar, Balakan, a village and municipality in Azerbaijan
Qullar, Barda, a village and municipality in Azerbaijan
Qullar, Qusar, a village and municipality Azerbaijan
Kullar, Koçarlı, a village in Turkey